The 1904–05 Irish Cup was the 25th edition of the premier knock-out cup competition in Irish football. 

Distillery won the tournament for the 8th time, defeating Shelbourne 3–0 in the final.

Results

First round

|}

Replay

|}

Quarter-finals

|}

Semi-finals

|}

Final

References

External links
 Northern Ireland Cup Finals. Rec.Sport.Soccer Statistics Foundation (RSSSF)

Irish Cup seasons
1904–05 domestic association football cups
1904–05 in Irish association football